The Welbike was a British single-seat folding motorcycle produced during World War II at the direction of Station IX — the "Inter Services Research Bureau" — based at Welwyn, UK, for use by Special Operations Executive (SOE). It has the distinction of being the smallest motorcycle ever used by the British Armed Forces. Between 1942 and 1943, 3,641 units (plus a prototype and some pilot models) were built and, although not much used by the SOE, some were issued to the British 1st and 6th Airborne Divisions and some were used at Arnhem during Operation Market Garden.

The Italians, Germans and Americans also developed small motorcycles for their airborne forces during World War II.

Development
The original prototype was designed by SOE motor cycle enthusiast Harry Lester, from an idea developed by Lt. Colonel John Dolphin, the Commanding Officer of Station IX, the secret Inter-Services Military Research Establishment based in a mansion called The Frythe (latterly owned by the pharmaceutical company GSK) an hour's drive north of London near the town of Welwyn in Hertfordshire, which had been taken over for the war effort. Once deployed, they were easily assembled and ready for use as quickly as possible. The name Welbike comes from the custom that all the clandestine equipment devised  at Station IX in Welwyn had names starting with Wel, e.g., Welman, Welrod. There was very limited space in the airborne equipment container, so the Welbike, which was carried in the container at an angle, had no suspension, no lights and just a single rear brake.

The fuel tank was as small as possible and, because its bottom feed point was located lower than the carburetor, had to be pressurised occasionally by a hand pump built into the tank. Tanks were pressurised before the Welbike went into action to save time. The Welbike was then packed into the parachute container with the rear wheel to the base of the parachute canister, which had a percussion head to minimise damage on landing. Once it hit the ground all that was needed was to twist the handlebars into position and lock them on spring-loaded pins. The saddle was pulled up and the footrests folded out ready to push start the two stroke engine and ride into action. The aim was that a paratrooper could remove the Welbike from its special green container (which was marked in white lettering with the words Motor Cycle) and its easily identified coloured parachute, and be on the road within 11 seconds. The prototype survived extensive drop testing at the Special Operations School at Arisaig in Scotland where it was demonstrated to the commando forces.

The prototype was then sent to Excelsior Ltd for further development. A number of pre-production "pilot" machines were built for further testing and experimental modifications at the Airborne Forces Experimental Establishment at RAF Sherburn-in-Elmet near Leeds in September 1942, including dropping them from aircraft to land by parachute. The Villiers engine was found to be seriously underpowered when ridden by a fully equipped soldier, so it was retuned to improve the power output.

The simple design of the Welbike meant that it was easy and quick to produce and from 1942 went into full production for issue to airborne forces. By 1943 it was also being widely used by ground assault forces, including the Commandos and the Royal Marines Commando units, particularly for beach landings at Anzio and Normandy. The small size of the Welbike meant that it also proved very useful as a general airfield transport by the Royal Air Force and aircrews based in the large Far East airfields would "stow away" a Welbike if they could find one.

There were three production versions of the Welbike. The first 1,200 were known as the Mark 1 and were a developed version of the original prototype with tuned engines and did not have a rear mudguard. 1,400 Mark 2 Series 1 Welbikes were produced which had a range of minor modifications, including the addition of the rear mudguard. The final batch of 1,340 was the Mark 2 Series 2 and had "saddle" fuel tanks with a splash shielding between them, and an improved filler cap replacing the original design which required the removal of the pressurisation pump which was found to be too time consuming.

In combat situations the Welbike could prove a liability as paratroops needed to get under cover as quickly as possible and had to find the Welbike containers before they could start to assemble them. The difference in weight between a parachutist and a container meant that they often landed some distance apart, rather defeating the purpose, and some were captured by enemy forces or lost before they could even be used. The low power and small wheels also meant that they struggled to cope adequately with the often rough battlefield roads so were often abandoned by troops who found it easier to continue on foot. Another problem for the Welbike was that, by the time it was in mass production, much larger gliders had been developed that could carry bigger and more powerful motorcycles such as the Royal Enfield WD/RE.

Production
Prototype Frame number 1.

Pilot models Frame number 2 to 13. The Prototype and Pilot models are distinguished by teardrop shaped saddle tanks. At least two of these early Welbikes have been saved (number 2 and one other).

1. Contract 294/23/S.789  dated 26 August 1942 for 1,000 (changed to 1,200) Welbikes Frame number 14 to 1214, War Department number C4658444 to C4659673. Received 15 October 1942.

2. Contract 294/23/S.1649 dated 19 November 1942 for 1,400 Welbikes Frame number 1214 to 2613, War Department number C5152014 to C5153413. Received Feb 1943 to 14 March 1943.

3. Contract 294/23/S.1946 dated 27 December 1942 for 1,341 (reduced to 1,241) Welbikes Frame number 2614 to 3954 War Department number C5153414 to C5154654.

4. Contract 294/23/S.3662 dated 21 June 1943 for 7,778 (reduced to 1,241 then reduced to 0) Frame number 3955 to 5195 War Department number C5367454 to C5368694. CANCELLED.

It appears that only the Mark II Welbikes had a contract number dataplate. This was brass and was attached to the frame below the seat post.

Corgi scooter

Many of the later models never saw action and were disposed of at the end of the war, mostly exported to the U.S. where they were sold by a New York department store. The lack of a front brake meant that they could not legally be used on the road, so most were bought by farmers for off road use. The originator John Dolphin developed his ideas further and set up the Corgi Motorcycle Co Ltd. of which he was Managing Director, and had them produced as the Corgi by Brockhouse Engineering (Southport) Ltd., who had been manufacturing military trailers during the war. The Corgi scooter was powered by an Excelsior Spryt Autocycle engine and went into production in 1947. Most were initially exported to North America branded as the "Indian Papoose" and not sold in the UK until early 1948, with some 27,050 being manufactured. The single-speed two-stroke engine proved too slow, and despite the high post war demand for transport, lack of power and reliability problems meant it was discontinued in October 1954.

Corgi scooters were sometimes painted a military green but were not much used by the British armed forces. A few were used by the Royal Navy. The concept continued to be developed by other manufacturers and led to the folding Honda Monkey bike of the 1960s.

Survivors

There are surviving Welbikes in countries around the world including the UK, US (where many were sold surplus after World War II) Canada, Australia, South Africa, India, the Netherlands, France and Belgium. Welbikes are quite rare and very few survive with the original War Department number intact as it was painted on. Many restorations have added a typical or estimated War Department number when the original was missing. The only permanent identity of a Welbike is the frame serial number which is stamped on the front of the frame, above the fork.

Examples include:
 RAF Harrington Aviation Museum, Harrington, Northampton, UK: WD Number C5152111
 South African National Museum of Military History, Johannesburg, South Africa: WD Number C4659131
 Imperial War Museum
 Musée de l'Armée
 National Motor Museum, Beaulieu

Two of the Prototype/Pilot models have been preserved: Serial number 2 found in Oregon, restored and sold to a collector in the Netherlands, and another with an unknown number in the UK.

Colin MacGregor Stevens' (MVPA Member 954 since 1977) private collection in Richmond, British Columbia, Canada, had three complete Welbikes Mark II: Frame Serial number 1253; Frame Serial number 3839, found in original condition in Ohio, USA; and Frame Serial number 2348, found in Australia, apparently one of the 302 Welbikes boxed for export and delivered on 16 March 1943.

Some Mk. II Welbikes had a contract dataplate on the frame, below the seat.

See also
List of motorcycles of the 1940s
List of motorcycles of the 1950s

References

External links 

 Welbike
 SOE Welbike 
 D-Day Paratroopers Historical Center Saint-Côme-du-Mont, France (Archived)

Motorcycles of the United Kingdom
Military motorcycles
World War II vehicles of the United Kingdom
Special Operations Executive
Minibikes
Motorcycles introduced in the 1940s
Two-stroke motorcycles